Pipeline: The Surf Coaster (shortened to Pipeline) is an upcoming launched steel roller coaster at SeaWorld Orlando in Orlando, Florida. Manufactured by Bolliger & Mabillard, the roller coaster was designed as a surf coaster model that will open in spring 2023. The roller coaster is themed on surfing, which will utilize surfboard-shaped vehicles.

The roller coaster will be the first-of-its-kind surf coaster, a roller coaster prototype that shifts the seats of riders up and down. Following Mako, Manta and Kraken, the roller coaster will be the fourth roller coaster manufactured by Bolliger & Mabillard located at SeaWorld Orlando.

History 
Development for a prototype for a new type of roller coaster begun on May 28, 2019, when roller coaster manufacturer Bolliger & Mabillard filed a trademark for the name "surf coaster". A project codenamed "Project Penguin" was revealed in January 2020 after site-work plans were filed with Orange County, Florida officials in what appeared to be a new attraction for 2021. This new project was planned to be built near the front of the park and a pathway near the Bayside Stadium. Subsequent plans were made in June and September 2020, which also confirmed the new project would be a "custom launch coaster" after Bolliger & Mabillard filed a patent for a stand-up roller coaster restraint. The plans fueled rumors that the surf coaster model would be built at SeaWorld Orlando.

Teasers for SeaWorld Orlando's new roller coaster started on April 14, 2022. In this first teaser, a picture of trees with roller coaster track behind it. Construction fencing was erected along with demolition of the surrounding area. The following month, on June 3, 2022, the park teased the attraction, warning those of a "high surf advisory" in 2023. The phrase "high surf advisory" would later be used as a hashtag to tease and promote the roller coaster. Due to the effects of Hurricane Ian, the announcement was delayed on September 28, 2022. During the teaser period, the park had started construction on the attraction. 

The last teaser for the ride was on October 14, 2022. In the teaser, the park had included in the teaser a video of construction on the attraction. The park officially announced Pipeline: The Surf Coaster on October 18, 2022. The park revealed details about the ride, that it would open in spring 2023. Additionally, the park revealed the ride would also be the first surf coaster in the world. Track for the roller coaster went vertical on October 24, 2022. The trains for the attraction were unveiled at the International Association of Amusement Parks and Attractions (IAAPA) Expo on November 15, 2022. SeaWorld Orlando announced on December 19, 2022, that installation of roller coaster track was completed.

Ride experience

Layout 
After exiting the station, the surfboard-themed train launches  into a  overbanked turn to the right. Following the overbanked turn, the train turns left into an inversion billed as the "wave curl" inversion by the park, before the train goes up and turns right into one of two helix elements. After succeeding the 360° helix, the train immediately turns into a second overbanked turn. Traveling into a banked airtime hill, the train turns right and then whips to the left into a second, 270° helix. Then, the train turns left immediately after the helix, before turning right, into the final brake run. The total duration for the roller coaster is approximately one minute and fifty seconds.

Characteristics

Manufacturer 
Pipeline: The Surf Coaster is a surf coaster model manufactured by Bolliger and Mabillard. Though the ride strikes similarities with the stand-up roller coaster model, the ride was clarified as not being one, as stated by Jonathan Smith, SeaWorld's vice president of rides and engineering. Smith expressed at the IAAPA Expo on November 15, 2022 that the differences were that unlike stand-up roller coasters where riders stand "erect", the restraints on surf coasters have movement. The roller coaster is the fourth Bolliger & Mabillard roller coaster at SeaWorld Orlando, the other three being Mako, Manta and Kraken.

Track 
The color of the track is teal and the supports are white.

Theme 
Pipeline: The Surf Coaster is themed to surfing, especially surfing cultures in California and Australia. The park bills the launch section of the roller coaster as a "surfing launch", along with "wave jumping motions", which shift rider's seats up and down to resemble the feeling of surfing. Additionally, the roller coaster's trains are designed to mimic surfboards.  The roller coaster's only inversion is titled the "wave curl" inversion, which is based on the "cork alley oop" surfing maneuver.

See also 

 Stand-up roller coaster

References

External links 

 Official website
 

Steel roller coasters
SeaWorld Orlando
Roller coasters manufactured by Bolliger & Mabillard
Roller coasters in Florida
Roller coasters planned to open in 2023